William Luther Hill (October 17, 1873January 5, 1951) a US Senator from Florida, serving as a Democrat in 1936.

Early life
William L. Hill was born in Gainesville, Alachua County, Florida on October 17, 1873. He attended the East Florida Seminary (now the University of Florida and became involved in banking and insurance.

Career
In 1914 Hill graduated from the University of Florida Law School.  He was admitted to the bar and practiced in Gainesville.

In 1917 Hill became Secretary (chief assistant) to Senator Duncan U. Fletcher, a post he held until Fletcher's death in 1936.  From 1917 to 1921 Hill was also Clerk for the Senate Committee on Commerce, and he was Clerk for the Committee on Banking and Currency from 1933 to 1936.

Senate appointment
When Fletcher died in 1936, Hill was appointed to fill the vacancy until a successor could be elected.  He served from July 1, 1936, to November 3, 1936. Hill was not a candidate in the election, which was won by Claude Pepper.

After completing his Senate service Hill returned to Gainesville, where he practiced law and remained active in Democratic politics until retiring in 1947.

Death and burial
Hill died in Gainesville on January 5, 1951.  He was buried in Gainesville's Evergreen Cemetery.

References

External links

1873 births
1951 deaths
University of Florida alumni
Fredric G. Levin College of Law alumni
Florida lawyers
Florida Democrats
Democratic Party United States senators from Florida
People from Gainesville, Florida
Burials in Florida